The George Local Municipality council consists of fifty-three members elected by mixed-member proportional representation. Twenty-seven councillors are elected by first-past-the-post voting in twenty-seven wards, while the remaining twenty-six are chosen from party lists so that the total number of party representatives is proportional to the number of votes received. In the election of 1 November 2021 no party obtained a majority of seats on the council. The DA did, however, win the largest amount of seats.

Results 
The following table shows the composition of the council after past elections.

December 2000 election

The following table shows the results of the 2000 election.

October 2002 floor crossing

In terms of the Eighth Amendment of the Constitution and the judgment of the Constitutional Court in United Democratic Movement v President of the Republic of South Africa and Others, in the period from 8–22 October 2002 councillors had the opportunity to cross the floor to a different political party without losing their seats.

In the George council, the three councillors of the George Community Initiative crossed to the Democratic Alliance.

September 2004 floor crossing
Another floor-crossing period occurred on 1–15 September 2004, in which two councillors crossed from the Democratic Alliance to the African National Congress.

March 2006 election

The following table shows the results of the 2006 election.

By-elections from March 2006 to May 2011
The following by-elections were held to fill vacant ward seats in the period between the elections in March 2006 and May 2011.

May 2011 election

The following table shows the results of the 2011 election.

By-elections from May 2011 to August 2016
The following by-elections were held to fill vacant ward seats in the period between the elections in May 2011 and August 2016.

August 2016 election

The following table shows the results of the 2016 election.

By-elections from August 2016 to November 2021 
The following by-elections were held to fill vacant ward seats in the period between the elections in August 2016 and November 2021.

November 2021 election

The following table shows the results of the 2021 election.

Notes

References

George
Elections in the Western Cape